Giovanni Battista Stefaneschi (1582–1659) was an Italian painter of the Baroque period. He is also called the Eremita di Monte Senario. Born in Florence. He was a pupil of the painter Andrea Commodi. In Florence, he labored for was Ferdinand II Medici, Duke of Tuscany, influenced by Jacopo Ligozzi and Pietro da Cortona.

References

1582 births
1659 deaths
16th-century Italian painters
Italian male painters
17th-century Italian painters
Painters from Florence
Italian Baroque painters